Bjedov is a Slavic surname that may refer to
Đurđica Bjedov (born 1947), Yugoslav swimmer 
Gojko Bjedov (1913–1937), Yugoslav volunteer in the Spanish War
Goran Bjedov (born 1971), Croatian basketball coach
Kosta Bjedov (born 1986), Serbian-Croatian football player
Mira Bjedov (born 1955), Yugoslav basketball player 
Nina Bjedov (born 1971), Serbian basketball player